Mertztown is a census-designated place in Longswamp Township, Berks County, Pennsylvania, United States.  It is located near the borough of Topton.  As of the 2010 census, the population was 664  residents.

Mertztown is located in Berks County at latitude 40.506 and longitude -75.665 (Mertztown Panoramio Photos.) and its elevation is 466 feet. It appears on the Topton U.S. Geological Survey Map and is in the Eastern time zone (UTC-5).

A branch of the Catasauqua and Fogelsville Railroad once passed through the Farmington and Klines Corner section of Mertztown, but the tracks were torn up years ago.

Mertztown was founded in 1823 by Robert Mertz. The population density is .01% Black, .01% Hispanic or other, and 99.8% white. Atlas Minerals, a major mineral company, is located in Mertztown, moved to the town in 1917, and has been there ever since. The town is down to one grocery store and two hardware stores.

Brandywine Heights Area High School is also located in Mertztown, as is Gateway Christian School. The area code is 610. The Toad Creek runs east through the village from Topton into the Little Lehigh Creek.

Social places in the area would include Mertztown Rod and Gun Club, Rockland Rod And Gun Club, The Inn At Maple Grove, and the Dryville Hotel.

Demographics

Notable places
 Dorney Road Landfill, which was added to the Superfund National Priorities List by the U.S. Environmental Protection Agency in 1984 and removed from that same list in 2018

References

External sources

 http://pennsylvania.hometownlocator.com/pa/berks/mertztown.cfm

http://pennsylvania.hometownlocator.com/pa/berks/mertztown.cfm

Census-designated places in Berks County, Pennsylvania
Census-designated places in Pennsylvania